Fort White was established in 1835 as a base for the British army during the Xhosa Wars. It is the Eastern Cape province of South Africa, near King William's Town.  It was named after Major TC White, Assistant Quarter-Master General of the Burgher Force and military land-surveyor and topographer, who was killed near the Mbashe River.

See also
 List of Castles and Fortifications in South Africa

References

External links
Eastern Cape, MIDDLEDRIFT district, Fort White Cemetery

White